Mukono is one of the districts in the Central Region of Uganda. The town of Mukono is home to the district's main commercial center and district headquarters.

Location

Mukono District is bordered by Kayunga District to the north, Jinja District to the east, Kalangala District to the south-west, Kira Town and Wakiso District to the west, and Luweero District to the north-west. The town of Mukono is about by road, east of Kampala, the capital and largest city of Uganda. The geographical coordinates of Mukono District are 00°28'50.0"N,  32°46'14.0"E (Latitude:0.480567; Longitude:32.770567).

Demographics
The 1991 national population census estimated the district's population at 319,400. According to the 2002 national census, the population was about 423,100, of whom 49.8 percent were males and 50.2 percent were females. At that time, its population growth rate was estimated at 2.7 percent per annum. In 2012, the population was estimated at 551,000. In August 2014, the national population census and household survey, enumerated the district inhabitants at 596,804.

Tourist attractions
The district has  a favorable climate, abundant rainfall, rich flora and fauna, and proximity to urban areas. The major tourist attractions in the district include the following:

Lake Victoria

Lake Victoria is  the largest lake in Africa and the second largest fresh-water lake in the world. Many water sports are available there. Lakeside leisure sites are also available.

Sezibwa Falls
In the middle of the district runs the River Sezibwa, believed by Buganda legend to have been borne by Nakangu Tibatesa, the wife of Nsubuga Sebwaato in Kawuna, Ngongwe, around the time of the Christian biblical prophet Isaiah. The river flows into Lake Kyoga. The nature of its birth makes the river a cultural symbol of great importance to Buganda's heritage.

The site also has a natural forest reserve, which has forest trails and nature walkways for birdwatching and forest exploration. Over 100 bird species and some wild animals, including rare species of monkeys, may be found at this location.

The Sezibwa Falls are also a cultural site of the Baganda and has cultural artifacts, including caves, 100-year-old trees, and special rocks of deep cultural significance to the Baganda of Buganda in central Uganda. It is one of the official cultural sites of the Buganda Kingdom.

See also
 River Nile
 Districts of Uganda

References

External links
Website of Mukono District Local Government
Home of Ssamba Foundation

 
Districts of Uganda
Central Region, Uganda
Lake Victoria